El oficio más antiguo del mundo (English: The World's Oldest Profession) is a 1970 Mexican film. It was directed by Luis Alcoriza.

External links
 

1970 films
Mexican mystery thriller films
1970s Spanish-language films
Films about prostitution in Mexico
Films directed by Luis Alcoriza
1970s Mexican films